Rhein-Neckar-Arena, currently known as PreZero Arena and previously as Wirsol Rhein-Neckar-Arena  for sponsorship reasons, is a multi-purpose stadium in Sinsheim, Baden-Württemberg, Germany. It is used mostly for football matches and hosts the home matches of 1899 Hoffenheim. The stadium has a capacity of 30,150 people. It replaced TSG 1899 Hoffenheim's former ground, the Dietmar-Hopp-Stadion.

The stadium is the largest in the Rhine-Neckar metropolitan area, although it is situated in a town with only 36,000 inhabitants.

The first competitive match was played on 31 January 2009 against FC Energie Cottbus, and ended in a 2–0 win for Hoffenheim. The stadium hosted international matches at the 2011 FIFA Women's World Cup. The Rhein-Neckar-Arena hosted the "2017 DEL Winter Game", an outdoor ice hockey game between Adler Mannheim and the Schwenningen Wild Wings on 7 January 2017.

Traffic connection
The Sinsheim-Museum/Arena S-Bahn stop at the Elsenz Valley Railway (Elsenztalbahn) is just over a kilometre's walk away and there are shuttle buses from Sinsheim main station. The stadium can be reached by car via the newly built Sinsheim-Süd junction of the federal motorway 6.

International football matches

Gallery

References

External links 

 Stadium information and photos 
 3D model of the Rhein-Neckar-Arena
 Stadium plans from club website 
 World Stadiums

Football venues in Germany
Sports venues in Baden-Württemberg
TSG 1899 Hoffenheim
Multi-purpose stadiums in Germany
2011 FIFA Women's World Cup stadiums
Buildings and structures in Rhein-Neckar-Kreis
2009 establishments in Germany
Sports venues completed in 2009